Horoměřice is a municipality and village in Prague-West District in the Central Bohemian Region of the Czech Republic. It has about 4,500 inhabitants.

Geography
Horoměřice is situated northwest of Prague, in its immediate vicinity. It lies in an agricultural landscape of the Prague Plateau.

History
The first written mention of Horoměřice is from 1273. Back then it was owned by the Strahov Monastery. The monastery lost the village during the Hussite Wars in 1421, but after changing hands several times, the monastery owned it continuously from 1598 until establishment of the municipality.

Demographics

Sights
There is a simple castle from the 18th century, which belonged to the Strahov Monastery until 1945. Today it is owned by the municipality, which intends to reconstruct and use it for social and cultural purposes.

Notable people
Benedikt Roezl (1824–1885), traveller, gardener and botanist

References

External links

Villages in Prague-West District